Spilanthes is a genus of African and South American plants in the tribe Heliantheae within the family Asteraceae.

Species
The species within Spilanthes include:

Formerly included
Numerous species once included in Spilanthes are now considered members of other genera. The best known of these is the toothache plant, which was formerly Spilanthes acmella but is now considered part of its own genus and is referred to as Acmella oleracea. Other taxa formerly included in Spilanthes include:
 Adenostemma
 Eclipta
 Heliopsis
 Isocarpha
 Jaegeria
 Melampodium
 Salmea
 Verbesina
 Wollastonia
 Zinnia

References

Heliantheae
Asteraceae genera
Taxa named by Nikolaus Joseph von Jacquin